Symphyotrichum bimater (formerly Aster bimater) is a species of flowering plant in the family Asteraceae that is native to the states of Chiapas and Oaxaca in Mexico, and to Guatemala. Its white ray florets bloom May–December, and it grows in pine-oak woods, ravines, slopes, and grassy openings at elevations .

Citations

References

bimater
Flora of Mexico
Flora of Guatemala
Plants described in 1944
Taxa named by Paul Carpenter Standley
Taxa named by Julian Alfred Steyermark